Abramino dall'Arpa (fl ca. 1577–1593) was an Italian harpist and the likely grandson of Abramo dall'Arpa. He was one of the few Jewish musicians in Mantua in the late 16th century. In 1587, he accompanied and comforted the dying Guglielmo I Gonzaga on a trip to Goito.

References
Hárran, Don. "Abramino dall’Arpa". Grove Music Online (subscription required). ed. L. Macy. Retrieved on March 5, 2007.

16th-century Italian Jews
Italian classical harpists
Jewish classical musicians
Musicians from Mantua
Year of birth unknown
Year of death unknown
Year of birth uncertain